Mohamed Samadi (born 21 March 1970) is a Moroccan former footballer who played at international level, competing at the 1992 Summer Olympics and 1994 FIFA World Cup.

References

1970 births
Living people
Moroccan footballers
Footballers from Rabat
Morocco international footballers
1994 FIFA World Cup players
Footballers at the 1992 Summer Olympics
Olympic footballers of Morocco
Association football midfielders
Mediterranean Games bronze medalists for Morocco
Mediterranean Games medalists in football
Competitors at the 1991 Mediterranean Games
Botola players
AS FAR (football) players